Leucoptera psophocarpella, the winged-bean blotch miner, is a moth in the Lyonetiidae family that is endemic to Papua New Guinea.

The larvae feed on Psophocarpus tetragonolobus. They mine the leaves of their host plant. The mine has the form of a blotch mine.

External links
A new lyonetiid moth, a pest of winged-bean

Leucoptera (moth)
Moths described in 1982
Endemic fauna of Papua New Guinea
Moths of Oceania